This is a list of all songs recorded by American rapper and producer Tyler, the Creator.

List

As lead artist

As featured artist

Notes

References

Tyler, the Creator